Solport is a civil parish in the Carlisle district of Cumbria, England.  It contains two listed buildings that are recorded in the National Heritage List for England.  Both the listed buildings are designated at Grade II, the lowest of the three grades, which is applied to "buildings of national importance and special interest".  The parish is entirely rural, and the listed buildings consist of a house with a barn, and a redundant Quaker meeting house.


Buildings

References

Citations

Sources

Lists of listed buildings in Cumbria
City of Carlisle